Alex Bowen may refer to:
Alex Bowen (skier) (born 1991), American freestyle skier
Alex Bowen (TV personality), British reality TV contestant
Alex Bowen (water polo) (born 1993), American water polo player

See also
Alexander Bowen (born 1990), American water polo player